Keroplatus clausus is a species of predatory fungus gnats in the family Keroplatidae.

References

Keroplatidae
Articles created by Qbugbot
Insects described in 1901